The 2010 AFC Challenge Cup qualification phase saw five teams advance to the finals to join three automatic qualifiers in the final tournament in Sri Lanka.

Qualification consisted of two sections.
 A playoff between the 19th and 20th ranked entrants (Mongolia and Macau)
 Four qualification groups for four teams.  Each group winner advanced to the finals, along with the best-ranked runner-up. Because of the withdrawal of Afghanistan, the ranking of second-placed teams excluded results of any matches against fourth-placed sides.

Seeding
Seeding was based partially on the FIFA World Ranks as at January 2009 (ranking shown in brackets).

,  and  chose not to compete.  Afghanistan withdrew prior to their first match.

Qualifying preliminary round
Moved from originally scheduled dates of 7 March and 14 March due to conflict with the qualification for the 2010 East Asian Football Championship.

3–3 on aggregate.  Macau advanced to the group phase on the away goals rule.

Qualifying group stage
Qualification was officially scheduled to take place from 2–13 April 2009, although the actual dates began before and extended beyond that. Each qualification group was held in a single location -  Bangladesh, Maldives, Nepal and Sri Lanka hosting their respective groups.

The teams were ranked according to points (3 points for a win, 1 point for a tie, 0 points for a loss) and tie breakers were in following order:
Greater number of points obtained in the group matches between the teams concerned;
Goal difference resulting from the group matches between the teams concerned;
Greater number of goals scored in the group matches between the teams concerned;
Goal difference in all the group matches;
Greater number of goals scored in all the group matches;
Kicks from the penalty mark if only two teams are involved and they are both on the field of play;
Fewer score calculated according to the number of yellow and red cards received in the group matches; (1 point for each yellow card, 3 points for each red card as a consequence of two yellow cards, 3 points for each direct red card, 4 points for each yellow card followed by a direct red card)
Drawing of lots.

Group A
Matches played in Bangladesh.
Times listed are UTC+6.

Group B
Matches played in the Maldives.
Times listed are UTC+5.

Group C
Matches played in Nepal.
Times listed are UTC+5:45.

Tie-breaking situation:
Kyrgyzstan ranked ahead of Nepal and Palestine on the basis of goals scored.
Nepal ranked ahead of Palestine on the basis of a better disciplinary record (Nepal 1 yellow card - Palestine 3 yellow cards).

Group D
Matches played in Sri Lanka.
Times listed are UTC+5:30.

Ranking of second placed teams
The best-ranked second placed team also qualified for the finals tournament.

Due to Afghanistan's withdrawal from Group C, matches against fourth-placed sides in the other groups were excluded from the following comparison.

Notes on the tie-breaking situation:
Bangladesh ranked ahead of the Maldives on the basis of goal difference.
Pakistan ranked ahead of Nepal on the basis of goals scored.

Final tournament
The final tournament, consisting of 8 teams, was eventually held from 16–27 February in Sri Lanka.

Qualifiers
The eight teams that qualified for the final tournament are:
  – automatic qualifier
  – automatic qualifier
  – automatic qualifier
  – winner Group A
  – winner Group B
  – winner Group C
  – winner Group D
  – best runner-up

The draw for the final tournament was done on 30 November 2009 at the Galadri Hotel in Colombo, Sri Lanka.

Goalscorers
5 goals
 Safiullah Khan
 Kasun Jayasuriya

4 goals
 Ibrahim Fazeel

3 goals

 Chen Po-liang
 Ali Ashfaq
 Döwletmyrat Ataýew
 Berdi Şamyradow

2 goals

 Enamul Haque
 Mohammed Zahid Hossain
 Huang Wei-yi
 Mirlan Murzaev
 Chan Kin Seng
 Pai Soe
 Yazar Win Thein
 Adnan Ahmed
 Chad Gould
 Rohana Ruwanthilake
 Arif Mirzoýew
 Mekan Nasyrow
 Didargylyç Urazow

1 goal

 Mohd Mamunul Islam
 Kamarul Ariffin Ramlee
 Keo Sokngon
 Teab Vathanak
 Chang Han
 Kuo Chun-yi
 Che Chi Man
 Leong Chong In
 Mukhthar Naseer
 Mohamed Umair
 Murun Altankhuyag
 Donorovyn Lkhümbengarav
 Khin Maung Lwin
 Myo Min Tun
 Pyae Phyo Oo
 Biraj Maharjan
 Atif Bashir
 Jadid Khan Pathan
 Said Al-Sobakhi
 Alexander Borromeo
 Asmeer Lathif Mohamed
 Shanmugarajah Sanjeev
 Gahrymanberdi Çoňkaýew
 Ruslan Mingazow

Own goal
 Geofredo (playing against Mongolia)
 Anton del Rosario (playing against Turkmenistan)

References

Qualification
2009 in Asian football